During the 2000–01 English football season, Brentford competed in the Football League Second Division. Despite a mid-table season in the league, the club reached the 2001 Football League Trophy Final, which was lost 2–1 to Port Vale.

Season summary

After a 1999–2000 season of consolidation back in the Second Division, Brentford chairman-manager Ron Noades spent conservatively in the off-season, acquiring only forward Mark McCammon, midfielder Eddie Hutchinson and defender Jay Lovett for monetary fees. Long-term injuries to full backs Ijah Anderson and Danny Boxall led Noades to sign Paul Gibbs on a free transfer from Plymouth Argyle and a number of loanees to provide cover in defence. There was also change in the goalkeeping department, with Ólafur Gottskálksson and youngster Paul Smith coming in to replace out-of-favour Andy Woodman and the soon-to-retire Jason Pearcey.

Continuing injuries as the season began prevented a solid starting lineup from being established, with Brentford winning only two of the first 12 matches in all competitions and languishing in lower-mid table. After being knocked out of the League Cup by Premier League club Tottenham Hotspur, the Bees' league form turned around, with Andy Scott moving from the wing back to his natural forward position and scoring seven goals in the following 9 league matches, though a failure to convert draws into wins led the club to tread water in the league placings. An FA Cup first round home defeat to Conference club Kingstonian in mid-November led Noades to relinquish his position as manager (while remaining as chairman) and hand the reins to his assistant, Ray Lewington, on a caretaker basis. Lewington would later become the permanent manager in March 2001.

Despite the beginnings of a run in the Football League Trophy under Lewington, chairman Noades angered supporters in January 2001 by selling top-scorer Andy Scott and utility man Rob Quinn to divisional rivals Oxford United for a combined £150,000 fee, in a bid to balance the club's books. Despite the sales, Brentford's league position improved and despite just three wins from a 9-match spell in January and February, the club rose to 10th-place in the table. With the Bees seemingly safe from relegation from the Second Division, the attention turned to the Football League Trophy and four wins in a row led to a matchup with Port Vale in the final at the Millennium Stadium on 22 April. Despite taking an early lead through youth prospect Michael Dobson, Brentford were pegged back and defeated 2–1. The fixture pileup caused by postponements and international call-ups took its toll on the team and just one of the final eight league matches of the season yielded a victory, which included a spell of four matches in eight days to close out the campaign. The Bees finished in 14th-place in the Second Division.

League table

Results
Brentford's goal tally listed first.

Legend

Football League Second Division

FA Cup

Football League Cup

Football League Trophy

 Sources: Soccerbase, 11v11

Playing squad 
Players' ages are as of the opening day of the 2000–01 season.

 Source: Soccerbase

Coaching staff

Ron Noades (12 August – 20 November 2000)

Ray Lewington (20 November 2000 – 5 May 2001)

Statistics

Appearances and goals
Substitute appearances in brackets.

 Players listed in italics left the club mid-season.
 Source: Soccerbase

Goalscorers 

 Players listed in italics left the club mid-season.
 Source: Soccerbase

Discipline

 Players listed in italics left the club mid-season.
 Source: Soccerbase

International caps

Management

Summary

Transfers & loans

Kit

|
|

Awards 
 Supporters' Player of the Month:
 February 2001 – Michael Dobson
 March 2001 – Gavin Mahon

Notes

References

Brentford F.C. seasons
Brentford